Westralia is a common contraction of Western Australia. Specific uses include:

The term was used by secessionists during the campaigns involved with Secessionism in Western Australia
, the name of two ships to serve in the Royal Australian Navy
, an armed merchant cruiser and later, infantry landing ship, operated during World War II
, a replenishment tanker operated between 1989 and 2006
, a passenger liner converted into a troopship and sunk in 1942
Westralia Airports Corporation - the company that operates Perth Airport, Western Australia.